The Managed Funds Association is a Washington, DC-based industry group representing the alternative asset management industry. It was founded in 1991 and is considered a leading financial services trade group. The association describes itself as advocating for "public policies that foster efficient, transparent, fair capital markets, and competitive tax and regulatory structures."

Leadership 
Bryan Corbett is MFA's President and CEO. Corbett began his tenure in January 2020 after serving as a senior executive at The Carlyle Group. Corbett previously served in the George W. Bush administration as Special Assistant to the President for Economic Policy and Senior Adviser to the Deputy Secretary of the U.S. Department of Treasury.  He also worked as counsel of the U.S. Senate Committee on Banking, Housing, and Urban Affairs under Chairman Richard Shelby. Corbett earned his JD from George Washington University Law School, where he was editor-in-chief of the George Washington Law Review, and earned his BA from University of Notre Dame. 

MFA's Board of Directors manages the business and affairs of the association. Board members are representatives of MFA member companies. The Board Chair is Natalie A. Birrell (Anchorage Capital Group).

References

External links
Official website

Trade associations based in the United States
Lobbying organizations in the United States